St Mary Cray railway station is in St Mary Cray, South East London within the London Borough of Bromley. Train services are operated by Southeastern, who manage the station, and Thameslink.

It is in Travelcard Zone 6, and the station is managed by Southeastern. Services are provided by Southeastern, and Thameslink. The station has four platforms, platforms 1 and 3 being for services to Central London via Bromley South, platform 2 for services to Sevenoaks and Ashford International and platform 4 for services to Gillingham.

To the west of the station the Up and Down Chatham Loop lines give access to the South Eastern Main Line where the next station is Chislehurst.  There are normally no direct trains between Chislehurst and St Mary Cray, as trains that use the connecting curves usually run non-stop between London Bridge and either Rochester or West Malling.

Access to the station is from a footbridge built over the railway. The footbridge is not part of the station (albeit painted in typical southeastern colours) with the entrance to the station built on the footbridge. The footbridge was refurbished in 2016. Lifts, cycle-shelters, ramps and handrails were added to improve access early in 2022. The station has 4 Oystercard readers rather than ticket barriers. 2 ticket machines are present near the footbridge.

The station is fully staffed from the first train to the last of the day, as all trains (except for Thameslink services) are dispatched by platform staff.

History
The station originally had two side platforms with the tracks in between. It was reconstructed in 1959 and now has two island platforms with tracks on either side of each.

Location 
The station is situated on Sayes Court Road, a short distance from the Nugent Retail Park.

Services 

The typical off-peak service in trains per hour is:
 2 tph to London Blackfriars via 
 2 tph to 
 1 tph to 
 1 tph to  via 

During the peak hours, additional services run between London Victoria, Ashford International and Gillingham. In addition, the service to London Blackfriars is extended to and from  via .

Connections
London Buses routes 51, 273, B14, R1, R6 and R11 and night route N199 serve the station.

References

External links

Railway stations in the London Borough of Bromley
DfT Category C2 stations
Former London, Chatham and Dover Railway stations
Railway stations in Great Britain opened in 1860
Railway stations served by Southeastern
Railway station
Railway stations served by Govia Thameslink Railway